Mikael Jansson (born July 15, 1958) is a Swedish fashion photographer and director. Jansson regularly contributes to publications such as American and French Vogue, Interview Magazine as well as photographing campaigns for luxury brands such as Estée Lauder, Coach, Calvin Klein and Louis Vuitton.

Jansson gained international recognition for a nude portfolio published in Dutch magazine in 1998. The feature spanned 82 pages and included fashion credits to nude images in a nod to Andy Warhol.

Jansson is currently based out of Stockholm but is frequently dividing his time between London and Toscana

Early life

Jansson grew up in Stockholm, where he was born. He began photographing in the woods of Sköndal (Stockholm) and just like many other visual artists Mikael had a great interest in birds. He knew all the different species from Fåglar i Färg, a praised book written by the swedish ornithologist Sigfrid Durango. 

Later in the 1970s and early 80s, Jansson photographed popular bands coming to Stockholm behind the stage and in VIP areas, such as Blondie, Roxy Music, Iggy, Bowie and the Clash, as well as musicians Chet Baker and Miles Davis. 

He then took on an assistant role with Swedish photographer Carl-Johan Rönn, where he received an education in the works of Stieglitz, Brassaï, Cartier-Bresson, Kerstész and Lartigue. Five years thereafter, he moved to New York to assist Richard Avedon during the time Avedon was working on In the American West.

Career

In 1987 Jansson returned to Stockholm and set up his own studio and darkroom, which maintains his archive today.  

By the early 90s, Jansson had moved to Paris and established his career as an international fashion photographer working for magazines such as Glamour, British Vogue, Italian Vogue, Numero, Arena Hommes Plus and Stockholm New, a magazine Jansson helped pioneer. It was during those years that he started a long-term collaboration with stylist Karl Templer, who, in a 2008 interview for French GQ, stated that Jansson's talent was "limitless".

Jansson's body of work encompasses both analog film photography, as well as digital. Jansson established himself with an international roster of international brands such as Chanel, Brioni, Zara, Swarovski, Calvin Klein, Lancôme, Louis Vuitton, Dior, and Estée Lauder.

He is currently commissioned for publications including Vogue, Interview Magazine, Vogue Paris, W Magazine, Vogue Hommes International, i-D, Love, Pop, Another Magazine and V Magazine. These assignments include high-profile celebrity features and include some of the most iconic talents of our time such as Brad Pitt, Gary Oldman, Jodie Foster, Cate Blanchett, Jennifer Lawrence, Emma Stone, Sofia Coppola, Ryan Gosling, Christian Bale and Marc Jacobs.

Writer Claes Britton said that the threads that tie Jansson's work together are the women he portrays, paradoxically strong and vulnerable, such as Veruschka, Tatjana Patitz, Isabella Rossellini, Carolyn Murphy, Gisele Bündchen Raquel Zimmerman and more recently, Kendall Jenner, Kim Kardashian and Bella & Gigi Hadid. 

Mikael Jansson is represented worldwide by Annette Wenzel at M.A.P ltd.

Projects
Witnesses (2018):

In 2017, Mikael Jansson received a grant to photograph Holocaust survivors in Sweden. The unique material was published in book format by Alber Bonniers förlag, but was also presented as a documentary. 

“This is unique documentation of a generation that is about to disappear," says publisher Albert Bonnier of Albert Bonniers Förlag. "The photos offer a memory of the Holocaust in a way that's impossible to resist. In times such as these, it's particularly important that we are reminded of the horrors those in the photos were forced to suffer through." Witnesses consists of nine oversized volumes that tell the survivors stories through photos and quotes. 

The exhibition Witnesses was curated by Daniel Birnbaum, director of Moderna Museet in Stockholm and the project is a collaboration between Mikael Jansson and Kulturhuset.

The book Witnesses is an archive box containing nine 16-page broadsheet volumes with all of the 97 living Holocaust survivors and their stories and the publication won the Swedish photo book award in 2019 with the following motivation from the jury: 

“In times of change and confusion, photographers take place in the public conversation. Especially when the time is about to run out. This project tells the story of one of the most horrifying events in modern history, with great integrity, respect and vicinity. The technical level of the images is not without significance, it grants the people and their stories great dignity. The directness of the presentation could have a vital contribution to our democracy”.

Daria, The Archipelago Series (2018):

Classic, dreamy, black-and-white pictures, taken on distant islets, on soft polished rocks long since worn and shaped by the movements of ice age glaciers. Islands that have become the very essence of innocence, Swedish-ness, voluntary solitude, and summer holiday freckles.

Mikael Jansson has always been heavily inspired by the Swedish archipelago and he spent most of his childhood there due to his fathers interest in boats. Jansson explores the very entity of its beauty together with the Ukrainian-Canadian supermodel Daria Webowy, which he has worked with on multiple different occasions. “She has something special. To me, she is not a model, she has something else. Something more personal which I found to be more important. It's hard to explain why you're drawn to certain people''

It would come to no surprise if Daria the Archipelago Series would be included in the Swedish, nature loving, cultural-history of the general public.

Iggy Pop (2011):

In 2010, Jansson photographed iconic punk and glam rockers for The New York Times. The book IGGY POP featured portraits of photographed by Jansson in Miami in December 2010. 

The book was designed by Greger Ulf Nilsson and accompanied the exhibition DUM DUM BOYS, which was published by Gun Gallery in 2011.

Speed of Life (2007):

Between 2003 and 2006, Mikael Jansson followed the Formula 1 circuit around the world, documenting the cars, drivers, race tracks and spectators on most of the seventeen stops on the grand world tour. From São Paulo to Shanghai, Bahrain to Indianapolis, we get to observe the interplay between monstrous capsules of speed and mortal men.

Exhibition Kulturhuset (House of Culture), Stockholm, 26 May-12 August, 2007. Book designed by Greger Ulf Nilsson, published by Steidl Verlag, 2007.

Mikael Jansson (1999):

The self-titled book is a retrospective presenting selected images of the first twelve years of Mikael Jansson’s career and features portraits, nudes and still-lives in black and white. 

The book is designed by Johan Fredlund, published by Beaufort Press, 1999. Writer and journalist Claes Britton wrote in the foreword: “His visual expression is blessed with a rare virtue in modern photography: timelessness.”

Dutch (1998):

In 1998, Mikael Jansson was approached by Matthias Vriens, editor in chief of cutting edge fashion magazine DUTCH, and asked to do a full magazine nude portfolio. Vriens idea was to give fashion credits to nude images. Mikael Jansson, together with stylist Kari Hirvonen, photographed for four days in this summer house and at various locations in the Stockholm Archipelago, with a cast of the greatest Nordic models of the era. The epic 82-page spread can be seen as a journal over Mikael Jansson’s classic black and white first twelve years stage of his career. 

“When I first asked Mikael Jansson to photograph 80 pages of fashion without clothes, I advised him to sit down, think about it and not respond right away. He immediately said yes, and then sat down” 

- Matthias Vriens, Editor in Chief, Dutch Magazine.

Exhibition 
2020: Unscripted Scenes (CFHill, Stockholm)

2018: Witnesses (Kulturhuset, Stockholm).

2013: Boychild (Unseen, Amsterdam).

2013: Dum Dum Boys (The Ravestijn, Amsterdam).

2013: Stockholm New (Thielska, Stockholm).

2012: Coming home from christmas (Gun Gallery, Stockholm and Scandinavian Art Fair, Online).

2011: Paris Photo (Grand Palais, Paris).

          Dum Dum Boys (Gun Gallery, Stockholm).

          Le Boucher (Hardorff´s Hus, Copenhagen).

2010: Fashion! - Modefotografi genom tiderna (Fotografiska, Stockholm). 

2009: Weird Beauty - Fashion photography now (Institute of Contemporary Art, Boston).

          Le Boucher (Sturehof, Stockholm). 

2008: Toys R Us (Brändström och Stene Stockholm, Stockholm). 

2007: Speed of Life (Kulturhuset, Stockholm).

2004: Art Fair (Galleri Christian Larsen, Stockholm).

          Fashioning Fiction in Photography (The Museum of Modern Art, New York).

2003: Chic Clicks - Creativity and Commerce in Contemporary Fashion Photography

          (Fashion Museum, Kobe)

2002: Chic Clicks - Creativity and Commerce in Contemporary Fashion Photography

          (Centre National de la Photographie, Paris. Institute of Contemporary Art, Boston). 

1999: Contemporary Swedish Cultural Manifestation (Zokei University, Tokyo). 

          Creative Time in The Anchorage (Brooklyn Bridge Anchorage, New York). 

1998: Underexposed, Subway Exhibition (Stockholm Subway, Stockholm)

          Fashion Photography - 100 of the world's most renowned photographers, 

          exhibition of contemporary (Nagoya, Tokyo).

          YSL - 40 years of creation (Spiral Garden, Tokyo). 

1995: The Generation of Swedish Photographers (The New Gallery, Miami. Parsons School of

          Design, New York. The Forum Gallery, Jamestown. The Swedish Embassy, Washington DC.

          Nordic Heritage Museum, Seattle. 

1994: Mode et Portraits (Espace Image - Scène Nationale, Bayonne. Musee National des Beaux

          Arts, Santiago. Musee National des Arts visuels, Montevideo. Musee Revolutionaire, Beijing). 

          A Positive View - Vogue Exhibition (Saatchi Gallery, London). 

1993: Catwalk (Museum of Modern Art, Stockholm).

References 

General
 Ballad of a Thin Man
 New York Times, Contributor
 Business of Fashion
 WWD: Coach Taps Chloë Grace Moretz and Kid Cudi
 WWD: Kendall Jenner Talks Calvin Klein Underwear
 WWD: Haley Bennett Fronts the ‘New Hollywood’ Issue of Interview
 WWD: Rafael Nadal Poses Again for Tommy Hilfiger’s Underwear Campaign
 WSJ. Magazine
CFhill: Speed of Life 
CFhill: Mikael Jansson
Fotografi: Norwegian photographic magazine
Witnesses: Bonnier
Witnesses: Documentary SVT Play
Witnesses: Article in Dagens Nyheter
Witnesses: Fotobokspriset, SFF (Svenska Fotografers Förbund)
Photographer Magazine, Mikael Jansson
Vogue: Kim Kardashian
M.A.P: Mikael Jansson

External links 
 

1958 births
Living people
Artists from Stockholm
Swedish photographers